Summerset is a city in Meade County, South Dakota, United States. The population was 2,972 at the 2020 census. Located in the western part of the state, it is the first city to incorporate in the state since 1985.

Summerset was incorporated in an election that was held on June 7, 2005. Opponents of the city's dissolution insist a population of more than one thousand, despite the formal pre-incorporation census indicating 597 residents. The city is located west of Interstate 90, between the towns of Blackhawk and Piedmont. The city shares its zip codes of 57718 and 57769 with these two towns.

During its first year, Summerset faced a few challenges. There was confusion about the location of the city's boundaries. A lawsuit was filed to dismiss the incorporation election; moreover, the citizens petitioned to have the town dissolved for a multitude of reasons, including high taxes; the petition failed.

This issue went to trial on September 14, 2006 in Meade County. A decision was handed down by the jury in the trial on September 15, 2006, siding with Summerset that there were indeed more than 1000 inhabitants at the time of the vote to incorporate. The plaintiff, Casey Dolney of Summerset, can appeal the decision to the South Dakota Supreme Court.

Geography

Summerset is part of the Rapid City, South Dakota metropolitan area, which includes Meade and Pennington counties.

Demographics

2010 census
As of the census of 2010, there were 1,814 people, 655 households, and 508 families residing in the city. The racial makeup of the city was 93.0% White, 1.0% African American, 2.5% Native American, 0.4% Asian, 0.2% Pacific Islander, 0.8% from other races, and 2.1% from two or more races. Hispanic or Latino of any race were 2.4% of the population.

There were 655 households, of which 46.1% had children under the age of 18 living with them, 65.8% were married couples living together, 7.8% had a female householder with no husband present, 4.0% had a male householder with no wife present, and 22.4% were non-families. 15.9% of all households were made up of individuals, and 2.4% had someone living alone who was 65 years of age or older. The average household size was 2.77 and the average family size was 3.11.

The median age in the city was 31.6 years. 31.1% of residents were under the age of 18; 5.9% were between the ages of 18 and 24; 37.7% were from 25 to 44; 18.8% were from 45 to 64; and 6.4% were 65 years of age or older. The gender makeup of the city was 50.5% male and 49.5% female.

Controversy
Summerset is totally an example of urban sprawl. Many subdivisions and master-planned communities are found in or near Summerset.  It is contiguous to other urbanized areas, is served by Interstate 90 which runs through the middle of the city, and a state highway which runs parallel to the interstate highway.

References

External links
Summerset: S.D.’s newest town gets set up while fending off troubles article at the Rapid City Journal's website
Summerset incorporation
 

Cities in South Dakota
Cities in Meade County, South Dakota
Rapid City, South Dakota metropolitan area